John Lyons (29 November 1878 - 11 June 1958)
was the Anglican Bishop of Ontario, then Metropolitan of Ontario in the 20th century.

Educated at Trinity College, Toronto, he was the incumbent vicar at Plevna and then rector of Burritts Rapids. He held further positions at Elizabethtown, Picton, Belleville and Prescott. He was appointed Archdeacon of Frontenac in 1930 and Bishop of Ontario in 1932; and, for his last three years in office (1949 to 1952), the Metropolitan of Ontario.

References

1878 births
Trinity College (Canada) alumni
Anglican bishops of Ontario
20th-century Anglican Church of Canada bishops
Metropolitans of Ontario
20th-century Anglican archbishops
1958 deaths